The Tapi (or Tapee) river is the longest river in southern Thailand. The river originates at Khao Luang mountain in Nakhon Si Thammarat Province, and empties into the Gulf of Thailand at Bandon Bay near the town of Bandon.

The river was named on 29 July 1915, after the river Tapi in Surat, India, shortly after the town of Surat Thani was named after the town Surat in Gujarat, India.

References

External links
 "Tapi River and Nong Tung Tong Non-Hunting Area", Wetlands of SE Asia

Rivers of Thailand
Gulf of Thailand
Geography of Surat Thani province